The Karaim language (Crimean dialect: , Trakai dialect: , traditional Hebrew name , , "language of the nomads") is a Turkic language with Hebrew influences, similarly  to Yiddish or Judaeo-Spanish. It is spoken by only a few dozen Crimean Karaites in Lithuania, Poland, Crimea, and Galicia in Ukraine. The three main dialects are those of Crimea, Trakai-Vilnius and Lutsk-Halych, all of which are critically endangered. The Lithuanian dialect of Karaim is spoken mainly in the town of Trakai (also known as Troki) by a small community living there since the 14th century.

There is a chance the language will survive in Trakai as a result of official support and because of its appeal to tourists coming to the Trakai Island Castle, where Crimean Karaites are presented as the castle's ancient defenders (Napora, 2018).

History

Karaims in Crimea and Lithuania
The origin of the Karaims living in Crimea is subject to much dispute and inconsistency. Difficulty in reconstructing their history stems from the scarcity of documents pertaining to this population. Most of the known history is gathered from correspondence between the populations of Karaims and other populations in the 17th to 19th centuries (Akhiezer 2003). Furthermore, a large number of documents pertaining to the Crimean population of Karaims were burned during the 1736 Russian invasion of the Tatar Khanate's capital, Bakhchisarai (Akhiezer 2003).

Some scholars say that Karaims in Crimea are descendants of Karaite merchants who migrated to Crimea from the Byzantine Empire (Schur 1995). In one particular incidence, migration of Karaites from Constantinople (modern-day Istanbul) to Crimea is documented following a fire in the Jewish quarter in 1203 (Tsoffar 2006). After the Turco-Mongol invasions, settlement of merchants in Crimea may have been encouraged in the 13th and 14th centuries by the active trade routes from Crimea to China and Central Asia (Schur 1995).

On the other hand, "many scholars consider Karaims as descendants of Khazars and, later, Polovtsi tribes" who converted to Karaite Judaism. Kevin Alan Brook considered the link to the Khazars as historically inaccurate and implausible while claiming Talmudic Jews (especially Ashkenaz) as the true preservers of the Khazar legacy.

The third hypothesis says that Karaims are the descendants of Israelite tribes from the time of the first Exile by an Assyrian King (720sBCE). The Karaim scholar Abraham Firkovich collected the documents arguing in favor of this theory before the Russian Tsar. He was of the opinion that Israelites from Assyria had gone into the North Caucasus and from there, with the permission of the Assyrian king into the Crimean peninsula. He also claimed that he has found the tombstone of Yitzhak ha-Sangari and his wife who he claimed were Karaims. Whether Firkovich forged some of the tombstone inscriptions and manuscripts is controversial.

Regarding the origin of the Karaims in Lithuania also there is no complete consensus yet between the scholars. According to Lithuanian Karaim tradition they came from Crimea in 1392 when the Grand Duke Vytautas of Lithuania allied with Tokhtamysh against the White Horde Tatars and relocated 330 Karait families to Lithuania (Schur 1995). Although linguistically sound, and in agreement with the tradition of the Lithuanian Tatars, claiming their origin from the collapsed Golden Horde, some modern historians doubt this assumption. Nevertheless, Karaims settled primarily in Vilnius and Trakai, maintaining their Tatar language; there was also further minor settlement in Biržai, Pasvalys, Naujamiestis and Upytė. Despite a history through the 16th and 17th centuries that included disease, famine, and pogroms, Lithuania was somewhat less affected by such turmoil than the surrounding areas. As a result, the Lithuanian Karaims had a relative sense of stability over those years, and maintained their isolation as a group, keeping their Turkic language rather than abandoning it for the local languages ("Karaim Homepage" 1998).

Genetic affiliation of the Karaim language
Karaim is a member of the Turkic language family, a group of languages of Eurasia spoken by historically nomadic peoples. Within the Turkic family, Karaim is identified as a member of the Kipchak languages, in turn a member of the Western branch of the Turkic language family (Dahl et al. 2001). Within the Western branch, Karaim is a part of the Ponto-Caspian subfamily (Ethnologue 2007). This language subfamily also includes the Crimean Tatar of Ukraine and Uzbekistan, and Karachay-Balkar and Kumyk of Russia. The close relation of Karaim to Kypchak and Crimean Tatar makes sense in light of the beginnings of the Lithuanian Karaim people in Crimea.

One hypothesis is that Khazar nobility converted to Karaite Judaism in the late 8th or early 9th century and were followed by a portion of the general population. This may also have occurred later, under Mongol rule, during an influx of people from Byzantium (Tütüncü et al. 1998).

As all Turkic languages, Karaim grammar is characterized by agglutination and vowel harmony. Genetic evidence for the inclusion of the Karaim language in the Turkic language family is undisputed, based on common vocabulary and grammar. Karaim has a historically subject–object–verb word order, extensive suffixing agglutination, the presence of vowel harmony, and a lack of gender or noun classes. Lithuanian Karaim has maintained most of these Turkic features despite its history of more than six hundred years in the environment of the Lithuanian, Russian, and Polish languages.

Most of the religious terminology in the Karaim language is Arabic in etymology, showing the origins of the culture in the Middle East (Zajaczkowski 1961). Arabic and Persian had the earliest influences on the lexicon of Karaim, while later on in its history, the Russian, Ukrainian, and Polish languages made significant contributions to the lexicon of Karaims living in Russia, Ukraine, Poland, and Lithuania.

Language ecology

Distribution of Karaim speakers
Today, there are Karaim speakers living in Crimea, Lithuania, Poland, Israel, and the United States. However, there only remain about 200 Karaims in Lithuania, only one quarter of whom are competent speakers of the Karaim language (Csató 2001).

Karaim can be subdivided into three dialects. The now-extinct eastern dialect, known simply as Crimean Karaim, was spoken in Crimea until the early 1900s. The northwestern dialect, also called Trakai, is spoken in Lithuania, mainly in the towns of Trakai and Vilnius. The southwestern dialect, also known as the Lutsk or Halich dialect, spoken in Ukraine, was near-extinct with only six speakers in a single town as of 2001 (Csató 2001). Crimean Karaim is considered to make up the "Eastern group," while the Trakai and Lutsk dialects comprise the "Western group."

Language contact
	Throughout its long and complicated history, Karaim has experienced extensive language contact. A past rooted in Mesopotamia and persisting connections to the Arab world resulted in Arabic words which likely carried over via the migration of Karaites from Mesopotamia. The Karaim language was spoken in Crimea during the rule of the Ottoman Empire, so there is also a significant history of contact with Turkish, a distant relative in the Turkic language family. Finally, Karaim coexisted with Lithuanian, Polish, Ukrainian, and Russian as a minority language in the other areas to which it dispersed where Karaims lived and had to speak the dominant majority languages.

Karaim speakers show a strong tendency towards code-copying (Csató 2001). Code-copying differs from code-switching in that speakers don't just switch from one language to another, but actually transfer lexical items and grammatical features from one language to another in processes that may be only for single instances, or that may have much more lasting effects on language typology (Csató 2001). Extensive code-copying is indicative both of the ever-shrinking population of Karaim speakers (leading to an insufficient Karaim lexicon and a high frequency of borrowing from Russian, Polish, and Slavonic languages) and of the high level of language contact in the regions where Karaim is spoken.

Multilingualism
Due to the very small number of speakers of Karaim and the high level of multilingualism in Lithuania in general, there is also a high level of multilingualism among Karaim speakers. Karaim speakers also communicate with the dominant languages of their respective regions, including Lithuanian, Polish, and Russian. Some also have religious knowledge of Hebrew (Csató 2001). Multilingualism is a necessity for Karaim speakers, because without other languages the majority would not even be able to communicate with members of their own family (Csató 2001).

Language health
Most dialects of Karaim are now extinct. Maintenance of the Karaim language in Lithuania is now endangered due to the dispersal of Karaim speakers under the Soviet regime in the aftermath of World War II and the very small number and old age of fluent speakers remaining (Csató 2001). Children and grandchildren of Karaim speakers speak Lithuanian, Polish, or Russian, and only the oldest generation still speaks Karaim.

Phonology

Consonant inventory

Vowel inventory

Phonotactics
While most languages of the Turkic family exhibit palatal vowel harmony, Trakai Karaim shows harmony in palatalization of consonants. Thus, in any given word, only palatalized or only non-palatalized consonants can be found (Németh 2003). Palatalized consonants occur in the presence of front vowels, and non-palatalized consonants occur in the presence of back vowels. Similarly to most Turkic languages, virtually all of the consonants in Karaim exist in both a palatalized and a non-palatalized form, which may be further evidence of their genetic relationship (Hansson 2007). However, care must be taken in assuming as much, because Karaim has been in contact with the Lipka Tatar language in Lithuania for hundreds of years.

Karaim also exhibits vowel harmony, whereby suffix vowels harmonize for front or back quality with the vowels in the stem of a word (Zajaczkowski 1961).

Morphology
Karaim morphology is suffixing and highly agglutinating. The Karaim language lacks prefixes but uses post-positions. Nouns are inflected for seven cases (nominative, genitive, dative, accusative, ablative, locative, and instrumental, which is rare in other Turkic languages). A notable feature of verb conjugation in Karaim is the possibility of abbreviated forms.

Syntax
Historically, Karaim had a typically Turkic SOV word order. However, it appears to have acquired somewhat free word order due to extensive language contact situations, and currently has a preference for SVO constructions (Csató 2001). Due to the agglutinative nature of Karaim morphology, pronominal subjects are frequently dropped as the same information is already represented in the inflection of the main verb. Karaim is head-final and uses postpositions.

Karaim syntax exhibits multiple instances of code-copying, whereby Karaim merges with syntactic properties of other languages in its area due to strong language contact situations. The impact of such language contact is also evident in the Karaim lexicon, which has extensive borrowing (Zajaczkowski 1961). In more modern times, the significant borrowing is also representative of insufficiencies in the lexicon.

Writing system

The traditional script of the Karaites in the Hebrew alphabet was used till the 20th century. In many Karaite families, they still have Hebrew letter handwritten collection of texts of diverse content, referred to as "miedžuma". The Karaim language has also been protected through translated religious works, such as bibles. Throughout the 20th century, the Karaite communities also used various modifications of Latin (Yañalif, Lithuanian and Polish alphabets) and Cyrillic alphabets.

Romanized alphabet of the Karaites of Crimea (Yañalif)

Modern alphabet 
In Lithuania and Poland, a modified Latin alphabet is used to write in Karaim, while in Crimea and Ukraine, it was written using Cyrillic script. From the 17th century up until the 19th century, Hebrew letters were used.

The Cyrillic alphabet of the Karaites of the Crimea

 Letters Е, Ю and Я used only after Л as an indicator of softness
 Letters Ж and Ц used only in Russian borrowings

The Latinized alphabet of the Karaites of Lithuania

Dialectology 
Pritsak 1959, treats the Turkic varieties of the Karaim community as a dialect of the Karaim language and distinguishes between the northwestern variety (Lithuanian or Troki/Trakai Karaim), the southwestern variety (Halich Karaim) and the eastern variety (Crimean Karaim). These communities share a common religious, historical and cultural tradition, and these breeds are linguistically related. Even so, the differences between the varieties spoken in the Halich and Lithuanian communities are so great that the users of both varieties prefer Russian or Polish when communicating with each other. The present differences are partly due to their development from different Kipchak breeds and partly due to the different linguistic environments that influenced their later development.

See also
Krymchak language

References

Karaim language

Further reading
Akhiezer, Golda. 2003. "The history of the Crimean Karaites during the sixteenth to eighteenth centuries." pp. 729–757 in Polliack, Meira (ed.). Karaite Judaism: A Guide to its History and Literary Sources. Boston: Brill.
Astren, Fred. 2004. Karaite Judaism and Historical Understanding. Columbia, SC: University of South Carolina Press.
Csató, Éva Ágnes, Nathan, D., & Firkavičiūtė, K. (2003). Spoken Karaim. [London: School of Oriental and African Studies].
—— 2001. "Syntactic code-copying in Karaim."
Gil, Moshe. 2003. "The origins of the Karaites." pp. 73–118 in Polliack, Meira (ed.). Karaite Judaism: A Guide to its History and Literary Sources. Boston: Brill.
Hansson, Gunnar Ólafur. 2007. "On the evolution of consonant harmony: the case of secondary articulation agreement." Phonology. 24: 77-120.
Khan, Geoffrey. 2000. The Early Karaite Tradition of Hebrew Grammatical Thought. Boston: Brill.
Kocaoğlu, T., & Firkovičius, M. (2006). Karay: the Trakai dialect. Languages of the world, 458. Muenchen: Lincom Europa. 
Wexler, Paul. 1980. The Byelorussian Impact on Karaite and Yiddish.
Németh, Michał. 2003. "Grammatical features." Karaimi.
Nemoy, Leon. 1987. "Karaites." In Mircea Eliade, ed., The Encyclopedia of Religion. New York: MacMillan.
Oesterley, W. O. E., and G. H. Box. 1920. A Short Survey of the Literature of Rabbinical and Mediaeval Judaism. Burt Franklin: New York.
Schur, Nathan. 1995. "Karaites in Lithuania." The Karaite Encyclopedia.
Tsoffar, Ruth. 2006. Stains of Culture: an Ethno-Reading of Karaite Jewish Women. Detroit: Wayne State University Press.
Tütüncü, Mehmet, and Inci Bowman. 1998. "Karaim Homepage."
Zajaczkowski, Ananiasz. 1961. Karaims in Poland.
Napora, Kamila. (2018, November 26). "Karaim Culture in Trakai"

External links

Crimean Karaite Association's page about Karaim Language
Karaim-Russian On-Line Dictionary
Spoken Karaim language project
Translation of Torah into Tatar (Karaite) language

Agglutinative languages
Kipchak languages
Jewish languages
Languages of Ukraine
Languages of Poland
Karaite Judaism
Karaims' language
Crimean Karaites
Endangered Turkic languages
Turkic languages